Marcos Vinicius Amaral Alves (born 17 June 1994), known as Marcão, is a Brazilian professional footballer who plays as a striker for Saudi First Division League club Al Ahli.

Club career

Early life 
Born in Tietê of São Paulo, he joined São Paulo FC youth team at the age of 12. However, Marcão, who was not interested in football, quit the sport after six months and turned to basketball. At the age of 17, he joined the Ituano FC Open Test and started playing football again.

Gyeongnam FC 
Marcão joined Gyeongnam FC on one-year loan on 20 December 2016. He eventually made a full transfer to Gyeongnam on a three-year deal on 17 May 2017. He scored 22 goals in the league and helped his team win the K League Challenge on 14 October, and confirmed the promotion to K League 1 the following year. In the K League Challenge awards ceremony after the end of the season, he won the season's best 11, MVP and top score. he made his first K league 1 debut with his first hat-trick in the first match against Sangju Sangmu FC on 4 March 2018.

Hebei China Fortune 
On 21 February 2019, Marcão transferred to Chinese Super League side Hebei China Fortune.

Wuhan Three Towns 
On 19 July 2021, Marcão joined China League One club Wuhan Three Towns.

Al Ahli 
In January 2023, Marcão transferred to Saudi First Division League club Al Ahli.

Career statistics

Honours

Club 
Ituano
Campeonato Paulista: 2014

Gyeongnam FC
K League 2: 2017

Wuhan Three Towns
Chinese Super League: 2022

Individual 
K League 2 Most Valuable Player: 2017
K League 2 Top scorer: 2017
K League 2 Best XI: 2017
K League 1 Most Valuable Player: 2018 
K League 1 Top scorer: 2018
K League 1 Best XI: 2018
Chinese Super League top scorer: 2022

References

External links
 
 

1994 births
Living people
Brazilian footballers
Association football forwards
Ituano FC players
Guarani de Palhoça players
Clube Atlético Bragantino players
Campeonato Brasileiro Série B players
Campeonato Brasileiro Série D players
K League 1 players
K League 2 players
K League 2 Most Valuable Player Award winners
Gyeongnam FC players
Chinese Super League players
Hebei F.C. players
Wuhan Three Towns F.C. players
Saudi First Division League players
Al-Ahli Saudi FC players
Expatriate footballers in South Korea
Brazilian expatriate sportspeople in South Korea
Expatriate footballers in China
Brazilian expatriate sportspeople in China
Expatriate footballers in Saudi Arabia
Brazilian expatriate sportspeople in Saudi Arabia